The Vientiane Jamia Mosque, is a mosque in Vientiane, Laos.

History
The mosque is the oldest mosque in Laos.

Architecture
The mosque is a two-story building, where the ground floor consists of the communal kitchen and the upper floor is the prayer hall. The minaret was constructed with Mughal architectural style. The mosque features an education room.

See also
 Islam in Laos

References

Buildings and structures in Vientiane
Mosques in Laos